Ferdinand Carl Maria Wedel-Jarlsberg (1 December 1781 – 16 April 1857) was a Norwegian military officer and commanding general of the Royal Norwegian Army.

Biography
He was the son of Frederik Anton Wedel Jarlsberg  (1748–1811) and Catharina Storm (1756–1802). He was born in Naples, Italy where his father served as Danish-Norwegian diplomat. His elder brother, Herman Wedel Jarlsberg (1779–1840), was a statesman and member of the Norwegian Parliament.

In 1790, he entered the Royal Danish Army. In 1807, he participated against the Royal British Navy during the Battle of Copenhagen. After resignation from the Danish Army he was appointed in November 1814 as a major in the Norwegian cavalry. Wedel-Jarlsberg was a commander of Akershus Fortress from 1819. In 1823 he became a Major General and head of the cavalry.

He was awarded membership in the Order of St. Olav in 1847, and won the Borgerdådsmedal in gold in 1850.

References

1781 births
1857 deaths
Danish military personnel of the Napoleonic Wars
Norwegian Army generals
19th-century Norwegian military personnel
 Recipients of the St. Olav's Medal
Wedel-Jarlsberg, Ferdinand Carl Maria 
Ferdinand Carl Maria